Rydzyna  is a village in the administrative district of Gmina Świnice Warckie, within Łęczyca County, Łódź Voivodeship, in central Poland.

Rydzyna lies on the left bank of the Ner river.

References

Villages in Łęczyca County